Robert "Bobby O" Olszewski (born September 6, 1977) is an American politician. A member of the Republican Party, he previously served as a member of the Florida House of Representatives, representing the 44th District which includes Windermere, Winter Garden, Gotha, Lake Buena Vista, Oakland, parts of Ocoee, and the Dr. Phillips, Horizon West, and Williamsburg communities in Southwest Orange County. The district contains Walt Disney World, Universal Studios Florida, SeaWorld, International Drive, and the Orange County Convention Center.

History 
After graduating from Dr. Phillips High School in Orlando, Olszewski earned an undergraduate double major from the University of Central Florida in Radio/Television (B.A.) and Organizational Communication (B.A.), as well as two master’s degrees in Management (M.S.) from Embry-Riddle Aeronautical University, and Corporate Communication & Technology (M.A.) from Rollins College. Dr. Olszewski also earned a Ph.D. in Business Administration from Northcentral University. Olszewski later served as a City Commissioner in Winter Garden. He was first elected with 71 percent of the vote, and ran unopposed for his second term. In addition to his service in the Florida House, Dr. Olszewski professionally serves as the Florida Partnership Consultant for Special Olympics Florida.

Florida House of Representatives 
After Eric Eisnaugle was appointed by Governor Rick Scott to serve as a judge on Florida's Fifth District Court of Appeal, Olszewski won the Republican primary in the special election. In the general election, he won with 56 percent of the vote.

In 2018, Olszewski ran for reelection to the House, being challenged by former state senator Geraldine Thompson. Thompson went on to defeat Olszewski in the general election.

See also 
 Florida House of Representatives

References

Republican Party members of the Florida House of Representatives
1977 births
Living people